Elías Rafn Ólafsson (born 11 March 2000) is an Icelandic professional footballer who plays as a goalkeeper for FC Midtjylland in the Danish Superliga.

Early life
Elías started playing football at the age of five. He also played both handball and volleyball in his youth and played two games for the Iceland national volleyball team in 2015. He subsequently quit both sports to fully focus on football.

Club career
Elías came through the youth academy of Breiðablik. In July 2018, he was sold to reigning Danish champions Midtjylland. In 2019, he was loaned to Aarhus Fremad where he appeared in 20 games. In August 2020, he was loaned to Fredericia. In December 2020, he signed a 5-year contract extension with Midtjylland. In September 2021, he was named the Danish Superliga Player of the Month.

International career
Elías was selected to the Icelandic national team ahead of its friendly games against Canada and El Salvador in January 2020. He was an unused substitute in both games. In October 2020, Elías was diagnosed with COVID-19, following Iceland's U-21 2–0 win over Luxembourg U-21. In March 2021, he was selected to the Icelandic U-21 team ahead of its games in the 2021 UEFA European Under-21 Championship.

He made his debut for the senior Iceland national football team on 8 October 2021 in a World Cup qualifier against Armenia.

References

External links
 Profile at the FC Midtjylland website
 
 

2000 births
Living people
Elías Rafn Ólafsson
Association football goalkeepers
Elías Rafn Ólafsson
Elías Rafn Ólafsson
Elías Rafn Ólafsson
Úrvalsdeild karla (football) players
Danish Superliga players
Danish 1st Division players
Breiðablik UBK players
FC Midtjylland players
Aarhus Fremad players
FC Fredericia players
Elías Rafn Ólafsson
Expatriate men's footballers in Denmark
Icelandic expatriate sportspeople in Denmark